Giovanni Rossignoli (3 December 1882 – 27 June 1954) was an Italian professional road bicycle racer who won 3 Giro d'Italia stages during his career.

Palmares

1903
 1st Corsa Nazionale
1905
 1st Milano–Torino
1906
 1st Milano–Mantova
1907
 1st Coppa Val d'Olona
1908
 10th Overall classification Tour de France
1909
 1st Stage 3 Giro d'Italia
 1st Stage 6 Giro d'Italia
 3rd Overall classification Giro d'Italia
1911
 1st Stage 3 Giro d'Italia
 2nd Overall classification Giro d'Italia
1912
 3rd Overall classification Giro d'Italia

Bibliography

References

1882 births
1954 deaths
Italian male cyclists
Sportspeople from Pavia
Italian Giro d'Italia stage winners
Cyclists from the Province of Pavia